Finn Trond Lützow-Holm (28 May 1890 – 4 June 1950) was a Norwegian military officer, aviation pioneer and polar explorer.

He was born in Nesseby as a son of priest and politician Ole Arntzen Lützow-Holm (1853–1936) and Anne Marie Riddervold Jensen (1855–1934). His mother was a daughter of Peter Andreas Jensen and granddaughter of Hans Riddervold. In May 1918 he married headmaster's daughter Birgit Lund (1893–1983). Their daughter, named Birgit as well, married Alv Johnsen.

Finn Lützow-Holm took part in the air surveyance of the Bouvet Island and of the Queen Maud Land in 1929 and 1931, together with Hjalmar Riiser-Larsen. He was commander of the Royal Norwegian Navy Air Service from 1938.

Decorations and awards
 Knight 1st Class of the Order of St. Olav - 1929
 Defence Medal 1940–1945
 Haakon VII 70th Anniversary Medal
 Norwegian Aero Club's Gold Medal,
 Gunnerus Medal in silver,
 French Legion of Honour
 Italian Al Valor Aeronautica

See also 
 Lützow-Holm Bay

References

1890 births
1950 deaths
People from Nesseby
Aviation pioneers
Explorers of Antarctica
Explorers of the Arctic
Norwegian aviators
Norwegian polar explorers
Recipients of the Legion of Honour
Royal Norwegian Navy Air Service personnel of World War II
Royal Norwegian Navy personnel of World War II